The 1986 NCAA Division I Outdoor Track and Field Championships were contested June 4−7, 1986 at Carroll Stadium in Indianapolis, Indiana, in order to determine the individual and team national champions of men's and women's collegiate Division I outdoor track and field events in the United States. 

These were the 64th annual men's championships and the fifth annual women's championships. Even though these championships were contested in Indianapolis, they were technically hosted by Indiana University Bloomington. Carroll Stadium, the event's site, is actually located near IUPUI, another school belonging to the Indiana University system. This was the Hoosiers' second time hosting the event and the first since 1966 (held in Bloomington). 

Southern Methodist University and Texas topped the men's and women's team standings, respectively; it was the Mustangs' second men's team title and the first for the Longhorn women.

Team results 
 Note: Top 10 only
 (H) = Hosts

Men's standings

Women's standings

References

NCAA Men's Outdoor Track and Field Championship
NCAA Division I Outdoor Track and Field Championships
NCAA
NCAA Division I Outdoor Track and Field Championships
Track and field in Indiana
NCAA Women's Outdoor Track and Field Championship